2015 Shenzhen Open – Doubles may refer to:

2015 ATP Shenzhen Open – Doubles
2015 WTA Shenzhen Open – Doubles

See also
2015 Shenzhen Open